Mordellistena austriacensis is a species of beetle in the genus Mordellistena of the family Mordellidae. It was discovered in 1956 and can be found in Austria, Czech Republic, Hungary and Slovakia.

References

austriacensis
Beetles described in 1956
Beetles of Europe